CCAD could refer to
Columbus College of Art and Design Columbus, Ohio
 Chelsea College of Art and Design, part of the University of the Arts London
 Cleveland College of Art and Design, the former name of The Northern School of Art, Middlesbrough & Hartlepool, United Kingdom
 Corcoran College of Art and Design, Washington, D.C.
 Cleveland Clinic Abu Dhabi, Abu Dhabi, United Arab Emirates
 Collins Cobuild Advanced Dictionary, Collins Cobuild Advanced Learner's English Dictionary, HarperCollins Publishers Ltd.